Old Copse, Beenham is an  biological Site of Special Scientific Interest south of Beenham in Berkshire. The site is private land with no public access.

Geography

The coppice woodland is on London Clay situated on the north side of the Kennet valley. The site is on gently sloping ground, with damp to poorly-drained wet clay soils.  A few small streams with associated wet flushes arise in the wood.

History

The copse is classed as ancient woodland having been there for at least from 1600 and still retains tree and shrub cover which has not obviously been planted.

In 1984 the site was registered as a Site of Special Scientific Interest.

Flora

The site has the following Flora:

Trees

Oak
Hazel
Ash
Ulmus glabra
Alder
Prunus avium
Maple
Birch
Salix caprea
Ilex aquifolium
Viburnum opulus
Sambucus nigra
Cornus sanguinea

Plants

Narcissus pseudonarcissus
Carex strigosa
Hylotelephium telephium
Hyacinthoides non-scripta
Anemone nemorosa
Mercurialis perennis
Primula vulgaris
Equisetum telmateia
Chrysosplenium oppositifolium
Ranunculus flammula

References

Sites of Special Scientific Interest in Berkshire